Papyrus Oxyrhynchus 4443 (P. Oxy. 65. 4443, TM 61923, LDAB 3080, Rahlfs 0996) is a fragment of a Septuagint manuscript (LXX) written on papyrus in scroll form. It is the oldest extant manuscript that contains Esther 8:16–9:3 of the Septuagint text and verse numbering. according to the text of LXX. The manuscript has been assigned palaeographically to 50–150 CE.

This fragment of a papyrus roll contains 31 lines of text in 3 columns. It is of semi-cursive script type. The scroll form and the presence of the uncontracted word θεός (theos, not in nomina sacra form) suggest that it is of Jewish rather than Christian origin.

The text of the fragment consists mainly of a letter of Ahasuerus that Jerome moved to form chapter 16:1–24 of the Vulgate. It is also referred to as Addition E and in the Septuagint text stood between verses 8:12 and 8:13 of the shorter Masoretic Text. According to Richard H. Hiers addition E "makes much pious reference to the power and justice of God".

The Masoretic Text of Esther makes no mention whatever of God under any title, although God is mentioned throughout the Septuagint text of the book and even more often in the independent "Alpha Text".

This manuscript comes from Bahnasa, Oxyrhychus, Egypt. Currently the manuscript is kept in Oxford, Sackler Library, Papyrology Rooms P. Oxy. 4443.

References

External links 
 High resolution image of P. Oxy. 65. 4443

Septuagint manuscripts
1st-century biblical manuscripts
2nd-century biblical manuscripts
Book of Esther